The men's discus throw at the 1950 European Athletics Championships was held in Brussels, Belgium, at Heysel Stadium on 24 and 26 August 1950.

Medalists

Results

Final
26 August

Qualification
24 August

Participation
According to an unofficial count, 18 athletes from 14 countries participated in the event.

 (1)
 (2)
 (1)
 (1)
 (2)
 (2)
 (1)
 (1)
 (2)
 (1)
 (1)
 (1)
 (1)
 (1)

References

Discus throw
Discus throw at the European Athletics Championships